Sammy Boeddha Renders (born 1 August 1993), better known by his stage name Sam Feldt, is a Dutch DJ, record producer and entrepreneur.

Career

Musical career
In 2015, he released a remake of Robin S.' "Show Me Love". The track was released by Spinnin' Records and Polydor. It became an instant hit, peaking at number 4 on the UK Singles Chart and reached the 21st position on the Dutch Top 40. In Australia, "Show Me Love" was certified gold. In Belgium, Feldt's track reached 15 and 13 on Billboard's Dance/Electronic Songs chart. In 2016, Sam Feldt released the song "Summer on You" together with Lucas & Steve. After reaching the number 4 spot in the Dutch Top 40, it became the most played track on Dutch radio in September and October 2016. Shortly after the release of "Summer on You", the track was awarded with a Platinum award in the Netherlands. Feldt was ranked on DJ Mags list of the Top 100 DJs of 2017 at 75.

Billboard described Feldt as "a modern house superstar", and his treatment of "Show Me Love" as "Anne reshapes the famous melody, while Feldt echoes the original with a bubbly deep house beat." The single "The Devil's Tears" (Sam Feldt Edit) was one of Spotify's top 10 most viral tracks. Feldt's debut album Sunrise was released on 6 October 2017, via Spinnin' Records. On 24 November 2017 Feldt released a double album titled Sunrise to Sunset, which consists of songs from his debut studio album and 12 additional songs. The double album was followed by his remix album After The Sunset, featuring remixes from Zonderling, Breathe Carolina and Calvo. In 2019, Sam released his track "Post Malone", which has hit 375 million streams on Spotify, as of November 2020.

With his project Sam Feldt Live, Feldt combines his digital music production with live instruments. His band, composed of Dutch trumpeter Quirijn and Dutch saxophonist Tariq, is featured on multiple Sam Feldt songs.

In 2020, Feldt revealed his own record label known as Heartfeldt Records, with "Hold Me Close" featuring Ella Henderson as the first official release. He has also created his own charity, The Heartfeldt Foundation, which raises awareness on global warming. The foundation has partnered with several DJs including Goldfish, Jay Hardway, and Blond:ish.

Discography

Albums

Studio albums

Compilation albums

Remix albums

Extended plays

Singles

Remixes 
2018: Shaun featuring Conor Maynard – "Way Back Home" (Sam Feldt Edit)
2019: AJ Mitchell featuring Ava Max – "Slow Dance" (Sam Feldt Remix)
2019: James Blunt – "The Truth" (Sam Feldt Remix)
2019: Ed Sheeran featuring Camila Cabello and Cardi B – "South of the Border" (Sam Feldt Remix)
2020: Möwe featuring Conor Maynard and Rani – "Talk to Me" (Sam Feldt Edit)
2020: Jaymes Young – "Happiest Year" (Sam Feldt Remix)
2020: JeeCee – "Milavain" (Sam Feldt Edit)
2020: Dermot Kennedy – "Giants" (Sam Feldt Remix)
2021: Sam Fischer and Demi Lovato – "What Other People Say" (Sam Feldt Remix)
2021: Duncan Laurence – "Arcade" (Sam Feldt Remix)

Notes

References

External links 
 

1993 births
Living people
Dutch DJs
Dutch house musicians
People from Boxtel
Tropical house musicians
Electronic dance music DJs
Remixers